K. Niran Prabhu (1923 – July 30, 2006) was a prominent Indian journalist who specialized in cricket.

Most of his best work was done while working for the Times of India newspaper. He joined the paper in 1948 and was the sports editor from 1959 to 1983. None of his works have been published as books.

He was awarded the C. K. Nayudu Award for his contributions to cricket in 1998. He is the only sports journalist who has received the C K Nayudu Trophy by Cricket Control Board, which is normally given to cricket players.

He and his wife, who predeceased him by two years, had a daughter and a son. After his death the Press Club Mumbai instituted the K N Prabhu Award for Excellence in Cricket Writing in his honour.

References

External links
Archive of Prabhu's articles for Mid-day 
 Obituary

Cricket historians and writers
1923 births
2006 deaths
Indian sports journalists
Indian male journalists
20th-century Indian historians
20th-century Indian writers
20th-century Indian male writers